Goat Rock Lake is a  reservoir on the Chattahoochee River, which lies directly south of Bartlett's Ferry Dam (Lake Harding) and north of Lake Oliver.  The lake is created by the Goat Rock Dam and Generating Plant.  The name of the dam and lake date to the construction of the dam in 1912.  Reportedly, construction workers saw goats jumping onto rocks in the river.

The reservoir is extremely riverine and little more than a holding lake for hydroelectric generation for Georgia Power.  Access to the lake is limited with one marina on the Georgia side and one on the Alabama side.  Goat Rock has almost no recreational activity, but it is well-known among locals for fishing.

External links 
 

LGoat Rock
Protected areas of Harris County, Georgia
Bodies of water of Lee County, Alabama
Reservoirs in Alabama
Reservoirs in Georgia (U.S. state)
Dams in Georgia (U.S. state)
Georgia Power dams
Bodies of water of Harris County, Georgia